Manuel Artigas y Cuerva (October 15, 1866 – April 2, 1925) was a Filipino historian and journalist who prolifically wrote in the Spanish language.

Biography

Early life
Artigas was born in Tacloban, Leyte, on October 15, 1866. His parents were  Miguel Artigas y Rodriguez, a Spaniard from Cadiz, Spain and Soledad Cuerva y Molina of Bulacan. They were originally from Baler but they moved to Leyte in 1860 when Soledad's father, an officer in the artillery corps, was transferred.

In 1874, his mother moved back to Manila. Manuel attended Colegio de la Immaculada Concepcion. He transferred to the Ateneo Municipal as an alumno interno de beca. He took up undergraduate studies in medicine at University of Santo Tomas. After three years he transferred to Colegio de San Juan de Letran. In 1883 he became a civil servant.

Career
He was recognized because of his incessant writings and in 1907, he became assistant librarian in the Philippine Section of the American Circulating Library. He initiated Act No. 1849 which created the Philippine Public Library.

In 1919 he was promoted to curator of the Filipiniana division. Then in 1911 he was appointed chief of the division. He rapidly expanded the Filipiniana collection from 829 titles in December 1907 to more than 20,000 titles in December 1914. Artigas did this by acquiring the private collections of James LeRoy, Jose P. Rizal, Jose Clemente Zulueta, T.H. Pardo de Tavera, Mariano Ponce and the Tabacalera. Due to his efforts, the Filipiniana collection of the Philippine National Library became one of the most complete collection in Philippine studies.

He was a member of the executive board of the Asociacion Historico-Geografica de Filipinas as well as the prestigious Academia de la Lengua Filipina. In 1915, he was inducted as an honorary corresponding member of the Real Sociedad Geografica de Madrid, and in 1916 entered the roster of members of the Real Academia de la Historia, and the Academia Hispano-Americana de Cadiz, Spain.

Aside from being a curator, librarian, and historian, Artigas also excelled in the development of Philippine historical studies through his many publications. Artigas wrote the biographies of Antonio Luna, Apolinario Mabini, Wenceslao Retana, Andres Bonifacio, Graciano Lopez Jaena, Juan Cailles and Mariano Ponce. Apart from these biographies, he also published the multi-volume Galeria de Filipinos Ilustres, a book about important and illustrious Filipinos during that time.

Artigas died on April 2, 1925. He was survived by his wife Luisa Losada y Mijares and 12 children. The family was left destitute because it is said that he left them nothing but his books.

Published Works
To supplement his income, Artigas wrote prolifically, basing many of his works on important archival materials:

 El Municipio Filipino (a collection of laws of Manila)
 Historia Municipal de Filipinas desde los Primeros Tiempos de la Dominacion Española hasta nuestros Dias (1894, 2 vols)
 Los Sucesos de 1872 (Manila, 1911)
 Reseña de la Provincia de Leyte (Manila, 1914)
 El Procedimento Administrativo y la Jurisdiccion Centencioso-Administivo y la Jurisdiction en Filipinas
 Diccionario Tecnico-histerico de la Administracion de Filipinas-Manila
 Historia de las Revoluciones Filipinas
 Historia de Filipinas (Manila, 1916)
 El Parlamento Filipino-Manila
 La Primera Imprenta del Filipinas-Manila
 El General Antonio Luna Novicio
 Reseña Historica dela Universidad de Santo Tomas de Manila
 Historia de la Instruccion Publica en Filipinas
 Bibliografia Medico-Famtaceutica.

External links
 

Colegio de San Juan de Letran alumni
1925 deaths
People from Tacloban
Spanish-language writers of the Philippines
Writers from Leyte (province)
20th-century Filipino historians
Filipino journalists
University of Santo Tomas alumni
19th-century Filipino historians
1866 births